Sir Robert Parker, 1st Baronet (ca. 1655 – 30 November 1691) of Ratton, Sussex was an English politician. He was a Member of Parliament (MP) for Hastings from 1679 to 1685.

He was made a baronet on 22 May 1674.

References

1650s births
1691 deaths
English MPs 1679
Year of birth uncertain
English MPs 1680–1681
English MPs 1681
Baronets in the Baronetage of England